The Oldzho (Olco), also known as Oldyo (Ольдё) or Olduo (Олдьуо), is a river in the Verkhoyansk District, Sakha Republic, Russia. It is a right tributary of the Yana.

There are no settlements near the river. The nearest city is Batagay, and the nearest airfield Batagay Airport.

Grayling and lenok are found in the waters of the river.

Course
River Oldzho originates in a lake in the northeast of the Khadaranya Range, located in a valley formed by the northeastern slopes of the Khadaranya and the southern end of the Burkat Range. The river flows first northwestwards, then makes a wide bend at the northern end of the Khadaranya Range and flows roughly southwestwards. After passing the northwestern end of the Ymiysky Range its course forms meanders and the Oldzo is joined on its left side by the Nenneli (Неннели), its largest tributary.

A trail goes along the Oldzho valley that joins the middle Yana basin with the valley of the Indigirka. The Oldzho is frozen between October and May.

See also
List of rivers of Russia
Chersky Range

References

External links 
 Geography - Yakutia Organized
 ХРЕБТ ЧЕРСКОГО (ЦЕПЬ ОБРУЧЕВА)
Rivers of the Sakha Republic
Tributaries of the Yana River